Atuna is a genus of plants in the family Chrysobalanaceae described as a genus in 1838. It is native to the Indian Subcontinent, Southeast Asia, and various islands of the western Pacific.

Species
, Plants of the World Online accepted the following species:
 Atuna cordata Cockburn ex Prance - Sabah
 Atuna elliptica (Kosterm.) Kosterm. - Fiji
 Atuna excelsa (Jack) Kosterm. – Thailand to the western Pacific
 Atuna indica (Bedd.) Kosterm. - Kerala, Tamil Nadu
 Atuna latifrons (Kosterm.) Prance & F.White - Perak
 Atuna nannodes (Kosterm.) Kosterm. - Peninsular Malaysia, Borneo
 Atuna penangiana (Kosterm.) Kosterm. - Peninsular Malaysia
 Atuna travancorica (Bedd.) Kosterm. - Kerala

References

 
Chrysobalanaceae genera
Taxa named by Constantine Samuel Rafinesque
Taxonomy articles created by Polbot